Janusz Andrzej Głowacki (13 September 1938 – 19 August 2017), better known as Janusz Głowacki or colloquially simply as Głowa, was a Polish playwright, essayist and screenwriter. Głowacki was the recipient of multiple awards and honours, including Guggenheim Fellowship, two Nike Award nominations and BAFTA Award nomination. He was awarded the Gloria Artis Gold Medal in 2005 for his contribution to Polish culture, and in 2014, the Commander's Cross of the Order of Polonia Restituta.

Biography
Janusz Andrzej Głowacki was born into an intelligentsia family on 13 September 1938 in Poznań. He was the son of Helena Głowacka (née Helena Rudzka, d. 1991), a literary editor, sister of Polish character actor, Kazimierz Rudzki; and Jerzy Głowacki, a crime fiction novelist.

Głowacki appeared in two plays produced by the Students' Satirical Theatre during his high school years and was interested in serious theater, which led to his enrollment to the Aleksander Zelwerowicz National Academy of Dramatic Art in Warsaw. He attended Academy, but by his own account had problems adjusting to the college, and dropped out. He later attended the University of Warsaw, where he studied both history and Polish philology and eventually earned a Master of Arts in the latter in 1961.

He began his literary career by publishing his collections of short stories depicting the cultural and social reality of the 1960s and 1970s in Poland, such as The Nonsense Spinner (1968) and The New La-ba-da Dance (1970). His works achieved great popularity and made him famous, thanks especially to his satirical portrayal of social phenomena in regularly published articles.

He wrote the screenplay for Andrzej Wajda's Polowanie na muchy (1969) (Hunting Flies) and co-wrote the screenplay of the popular Polish movie Rejs (The Cruise), released in 1970. The 2001 film Mechanical Suite is based on his short story Brothers. Głowacki co-wrote screenplay for Cold War, which was selected to compete for the Palme d'Or at the 2018 Cannes Film Festival.

In 1981 he emigrated to New York City in the wake of the imposition of martial law in Poland by its Communist government. There, he was nominated for the Charles MacArthur Award for Outstanding New Play for Antigone in New York (1994). He was prominent in New York City society and the arts.

Głowacki taught creative writing at Columbia University and Bennington College. Additionally he worked as the visiting playwright at New York Public Theater, Mark Taper Forum and Atlantic Center for the Arts.

On August 19, 2017, Głowacki died unexpectedly during his holidays in Egypt.

Awards and honours

 1982: The Guardian and The Times named Cinders the best play of the year
 1987: American Theatre Critics Association Award for Hunting Cockroaches
 1987: Joseph Kesselring Honorary Mention
 1987: John S. Guggenheim Award
 1987: Hollywood Drama League Critics Award
 1987: Time Magazine named Hunting Cockroaches the best play of the year
 1988: National Endowment for the Arts
 1993: Time Magazine named Antigone in New York one of the best plays of the year
 1994: Nomination for The Charles MacArthur Award for Outstanding New Play for Antigone in New York
 1994: Jurzykowski Prize
 1997: Le Baladin Award, Paris
 1997: Students of Sorbonne Award, Paris
 1998: Critics Award for Antigone in New York, staged in Proscenium Theatre in Paris
 1999: Tony Cox Award at Nantucket Film Festival 
 2001: The Fourth Sister wins at International Theatre Festival in Dubrovnik
 2002: Grand Prix for the best author at "Rzeczywistość przedstawiona" Festival
 2002: Nomination for Nike Award 
 2003: Grand Prix at Two Theatres Festival
 2005: Śląski Wawrzyn Literacki 
 2005: Award of Ministry of Culture and National Heritage for literature
 2005: Nomination for Nike Award 
 2011: Czesław Miłosz Award given by US Embassy in Warsaw
 2011: Warsaw Literary Award
 2013: Gustaw Award
 2013: Special Award "Diamond of Polish Radio Three"
 2013: Neptune Award - Gdańsk Literary Award
2013: Jan Michalski Prize for Literature, finalist, Good Night, Dzerzi!
2018: Winner of European Film Award for Best Screenplay for Cold War (with Paweł Pawlikowski) 
2019: Nomination for BAFTA Award for Best Original Screenplay (with Paweł Pawlikowski)

References

External links

 Glowacki's homepage
 Janusz Głowacki's Alphabet
 Janusz Głowacki at Culture.pl

1938 births
2017 deaths
American male screenwriters
Polish emigrants to the United States
Writers from Poznań
Recipients of the Gold Medal for Merit to Culture – Gloria Artis
International Writing Program alumni
20th-century Polish screenwriters
Male screenwriters
20th-century Polish dramatists and playwrights
20th-century Polish male writers
21st-century screenwriters
21st-century Polish dramatists and playwrights
21st-century Polish male writers